Third Alto Perú campaign (1815): The Northern Army, unofficially commanded by José Rondeau, started another campaign, but this time without the authorization of Supreme Director Álvarez Thomas. With the lack of official support, the army faced anarchy and later would lose the aid of the Provincial Army of Salta, commanded by Martín Miguel de Güemes. After being defeated in the battles of Venta y Media (October 21) and Sipe-Sipe (November 28), the northern territories were lost. They were reannexed by the Spanish Viceroyalty of Peru, and later became present-day Bolivia. This unsuccessful outcome to the campaign would spread rumors in Europe that the May Revolution was over.

See also 
Argentine War of Independence

Campaigns of the Argentine War of Independence